"The Ink in the Well" is a song by the English singer-songwriter David Sylvian. It was released in August 1984 as the second single from his debut solo album Brilliant Trees.

Reception
Reviewing the song for Record Mirror, Eden wrote "Mention David Sylvian and the adjectives that immediately spring to mind are sensitive, delicate, moody. 'Ink in the Well' lives up to David's reputation, it's accomplished with endearing lyrics and an interesting jazzy interlude occurs halfway through the song".

Personnel
On "The Ink in the Well":

 David Sylvian – vocals, synthesizers
 Phil Palmer – guitar
 Danny Thompson – double bass
 Kenny Wheeler – flugelhorn
 Steve Jansen – drums

On "Weathered Wall":

 David Sylvian – synthesizer
 Richard Barbieri – synthesizer
 Ryuichi Sakamoto – piano
 John Hassell – trumpet
 Holger Czukay – dictaphone
 Steve Jansen – drums, percussion

Technical:

 David Sylvian – cover design, remixing ("The Ink in the Well")
 Nigel Walker – remixing ("The Ink in the Well")
 Peter Williams – engineer
 Steve Nye – engineer, mixing
 Anton Corbijn – photography
 Yuka Fujii – photography

Chart positions

References

External links

1984 songs
1984 singles
David Sylvian songs
Songs written by David Sylvian
Songs written by Jon Hassell
Virgin Records singles